Nedaf Kheyl (also Romanized as Nedāf Kheyl and Nedāfakhīl; also known as Nedābakhl) is a village in Mehravan Rural District, in the Central District of Neka County, Mazandaran Province, Iran. At the 2006 census, its population was 210, in 51 families.

References 

Populated places in Neka County